Tanglewood Numbers is the fifth studio album by Silver Jews, released in 2005.

Like on all of their other albums, Silver Jews' principal song writer and constant band member is David Berman. On this album fourteen other musicians are involved in the performance and creation.
Tanglewood Numbers marked the return of Pavement members Stephen Malkmus and Bob Nastanovich into Silver Jews. Malkmus had last appeared on American Water while Nastanovich had last appeared on the band's debut album Starlite Walker. Cassie Berman, David Berman's then wife, also appears, as does Will Oldham.

The album's cover is a photograph by famed Southern photographer William Eggleston.

Background
In the four years between Bright Flight and Tanglewood Numbers, Silver Jews frontman David Berman had suffered from substance abuse, depression and a suicide attempt. However, Berman was able to rehabilitate and he became more deeply involved into his Jewish faith.

During its recording, Tanglewood Numbers was nearly destroyed in a fire that burned down Memphis' historic Easley-McCain studio, where the album was going to be mastered.

Reception

Tanglewood Numbers has received mostly positive reviews. According to Metacritic, the album has a score of 81 out of 100, based on 32 critics reviews, indicating "Universal acclaim."

Giving the album a 4.5 out of 5 stars, Heather Phares of Allmusic, in references to Berman's past problem, wrote "Hopefully the circumstances around Tanglewood Numbers will never repeat themselves, but there's no denying that this is a uniquely powerful and moving set of songs." Popmatters' Josh Berquist also gave the album a positive review, writing "Even if it’s not their finest work, it certainly feels like it is. There is a visceral vitality to Tanglewood Numbers that has never inhabited any album prior."

In a more mixed review, Dusted Reviews' Nathan Hogan criticized Berman's less prominent vocals, writing "...Berman’s a brilliant lyricist with 30 or 40 minutes to spare every couple of years, and his voice seems oddly absent from this record." However, Hogan concluded his review with "In the end, disliking Tanglewood Numbers leaves me feeling a bit like one of the schlubs who groused about Dylan going electric... I suppose it’s possible this record’s a grower. For the time being, that’s the best there is to say about it."

Track listing

Personnel
The following people contributed to Tanglewood Numbers:

Silver Jews

 David Berman
 Brian Kotzur
 Mike Fellows
 Stephen Malkmus
 Bob Nastanovich
 Cassie Berman
 Tony Crow
 Paz Lenchantin
 Azita Youssefi

 Bobby Bare, Jr.
 Will Oldham
 Duane Denison
 Pete Cummings
 William Tyler
 John St. West

Recording personnel
 Joe Funderburk - Mixing
 David Henry - Vocal Engineer
 Mark Nevers - Engineer
 Roger Seibel - Mastering

Additional personnel
 Alexander Graham Bell - Drawing
 William Eggleston - Photography
 Gerônimo - Drawing
 Jessica Jackson Hutchins - Drawing

Charts

References

2005 albums
Silver Jews albums
Drag City (record label) albums